Deadline is a reality television series, aired on ITV2 during April and May 2007. It featured ten celebrities compiling a magazine with Janet Street-Porter as the editor-in-chief.

Content
Throughout the reality series, ten celebrities had to compile and construct a celebrity based magazine called Deadline, which was then be added as a supplement in weekly issues of Closer Magazine. Each week, the celebrity figures had to fill the twelve empty pages of their Deadline magazine with real life stories, celebrity gossip and celebrity photographs.

The magazine was required to consist of one real life story, a celebrity interview and a gossip page. These ten celebrities were also required to take celebrity photos themselves and therefore become acquainted with a high-tech camera and establish themselves as a temporary member of the paparazzi. They had to photograph every celebrity they encountered and secure the picture for the all important front page.

Each week, chief editor Janet Street-Porter, picture editor Darryn Lyons and copy editor Joe Mott were then required to decide on three celebrities who had performed the poorest and consequently sack one of the three celebrity journalists, basing their decision on their overall performance and participation within the formation of the magazine edition.

When it was time to reveal the celebrity who was going to be sacked, Street-Porter called all the remaining celebrities into the boardroom and gave the three chosen for a potential sacking, to justify why they should stay on the magazine. With no further discussion, Street-Porter instructed one of them to "clear your desk."

The final week of constructing the magazine consisted of just four celebrities. In the final minutes of the time working on the magazine, the four remaining celebrities were asked to enter the boardroom and two were told that they had not made the final two. The two who were believed to have performed the best on the magazine were asked to open an envelope which contained the final copy of the magazine, where they would see the winner's face printed on the front page. The winner of the series received a £50,000 "bonus".

Celebrity participants

References

Deadline magazines at Janet Street-Porter's website

2000s British reality television series
2007 British television series debuts
2007 British television series endings
ITV reality television shows
Television series by Endemol